John Howard Jackson (April 6, 1932 – November 7, 2015) was an American legal scholar and educator, expert in international trade law.

Biography 

John H. Jackson was born in Kansas City, Missouri to Howard Clifford and Lucile (Deischer) Jackson. He graduated from Hickman High School in Columbia, Missouri, in 1950. In 1954 he obtained a A.B. from Woodrow Wilson School of Public and International Affairs, Princeton University. Then, he served two years in the US Army stationed in Japan. In 1959,  he earned his LL.B. from the University of Michigan Law School.

After two years of private law practice at the large corporate law firm Foley, Sammond & Lardner in Milwaukee, Wisconsin,  he became professor at the University of California at Berkeley Law School (1961–1966), the University of Michigan Law School in Ann Arbor (1966–1997), and Georgetown University Law Center in Washington, D.C. (1998–2014).  In 1968–1969 John H. Jackson was visiting professor at the University of Delhi, India and in 1975–1976  at the University of Brussels, Belgium.

In 1973–1974 he took a leave and served as General Counsel to the U.S. Office of the Trade Representative and worked on the Trade Act of 1974. In 1988–1989 he was Associate Vice President for Academic Affairs at the University of Michigan. Throughout the years, he was also an adviser to a number of congressional committees on trade policy.

He was a Vice President of the American Society of International Law (1990–1992) and organized its International Economic Law Group.

He was regarded as one of the chief architects of the World Trade Organization and its dispute settlement procedure.

He was the director of the Institute of International Economic Law, Georgetown University Law Center and editor-in-chief of the Journal of International Economic Law.

Honours
 Doctor Iuris Honoris Causa, University of Hamburg, Hamburg, Germany, 2003.
 Doctor Honoris Causa, European University Institute, Florence, Italy, 2008.
 The John H. Jackson Moot Court Competition

Selected bibliography

Notes

External links
 
 
 

 
 
 
 

Georgetown University Law Center faculty
University of Michigan Law School faculty
University of Michigan Law School alumni
UC Berkeley School of Law faculty
Princeton University alumni
1932 births
2015 deaths
People from Kansas City, Missouri
Economists from Missouri
20th-century American lawyers